Elman is both a surname. Notable people with the name include:

Surname:
 Dave Elman (1900–1967), American hypnotist
 Jeffrey Elman (1948–2018), American psycholinguist and pioneer in the field of neural networks
 Mischa Elman (1891–1967), Ukrainian-born violinist
 Richard Elman (writer) (1934–1997), American author and teacher
 Ziggy Elman (1914–1968), American jazz trumpeter

Sea also
 Elman (name)